Nate Mann is an American actor.

Mann attended Germantown Academy, graduating in 2015. He would first study acting at Walnut Street Theatre, and then at Juilliard School, earning a Bachelor of Fine Arts degree in 2019.

Mann made his stage debut in an Off-Broadway production of Little Women, directed by Kate Hamill.

In 2021, Mann was cast to star in the Apple TV+ miniseries Masters of the Air, and also appears in the Paul Thomas Anderson film Licorice Pizza.

Filmography

Film

Television

Stage

References

External links
Nate Mann at the Internet Movie Database
Nate Mann at BroadwayWorld

American actors
Germantown Academy alumni
Juilliard School alumni
Year of birth missing (living people)
Living people